Ste.-Thérèse Creek (also Ste-Thérèse Creek) is a stream in the town of Hearst and in the Unorganized North Part of Cochrane District in northeastern Ontario, Canada. It is in the Moose River drainage basin and is a tributary of Lac Ste. Thérèse (a lake).

Course
The creek begins at an unnamed marsh in geographic Hanlan Township in the town of Hearst, flows northeast out of Hearst — but still in Hanlan Township — into Unorganized North Cochrane District, then continues northeast and passes into geographic Casgrain Township. The creek heads north, looping east then back west under Ontario Highway 583, and reaches its mouth at Lac Ste. Thérèse at the community of Lac-Sainte-Thérèse. Lac Ste.-Thérèse drains via the Pivabiska Narrows, Lac Pivabiska, the Pivabiska River, the Missinaibi River and the Moose River to James Bay.

References

Rivers of Cochrane District